Florence E. Sutton (September 2, 1883 – October 16, 1974) was an American tennis player.

Biography

She was born on September 2, 1883 to Adolphus De Gruchy Sutton and Adelina Esther Godfray. She was the sister of tennis champion May Godfrey Sutton and the aunt of U.S. National singles champion John Doeg and Australian Championship winner Dorothy Cheney.

Sutton was a finalist for both singles and doubles titles in the US Open in 1911. In the singles final she lost Hazel Hotchkiss Wightman in three sets.

She achieved a highest national ranking of No.2 in 1914.

She also played, with her sisters May and Violet, on the Pasadena High School basketball team, which went undefeated in 1900.

In 1924, after her active playing career, she became a tennis coach at the Women's National Golf and Tennis Club in Glen Head.
Sutton died on October 16, 1974.

Grand Slam finals

Singles (1 runner-up)

Doubles (1 runner-up)

Other significant finals

Singles (1 runner-up)

Doubles (1 runner-up)

Notes

References

1883 births
1974 deaths
American female tennis players
English emigrants to the United States